Piñas is a canton in the El Oro Province, Ecuador. Its seat is Piñas. It is also known as the "Orchid of The Andes" because of the many orchids grown nearby. The town was named Piñas by Juan de Loayza, in honor of his homeland Piñas in Spain.

The canton was created on November 8, 1940. It is bordered to the north by Atahualpa, to the south by Loja, to the east by Portovelo and Zaruma and to the west by Balsas and Marcabelí. Economic activity includes agriculture such as cattle raising and cocoa and sugar cane growing.

Parishes
The canton has 10 parishes (6 rural and 4 urban) totalling approximately 40,000 inhabitants.

Urban parishes:  
Piñas (administrative centre)
La Susaya
Piñas grande
San Jacinto
Pata grande
Rural parishes:
Piedras
Saracay
Capiro
La bocana
San Roque
Moro Moro

Demographics
Ethnic groups as of the Ecuadorian census of 2010:
Mestizo  86.6%
White  6.6%
Montubio  4.3%
Afro-Ecuadorian  2.2%
Indigenous  0.1%
Other  0.1%

Tourism
The "Orquideario" is an orchid garden located in the town and managed by the Fundación Piñas Oasis Ecologico.  
Buenaventura Forest, located on the road to the coast a few minutes away from Piñas, is a private nature reserve whose attractions include 30 species of hummingbird and the rare El Oro parakeet and Ecuadorian tapaculo. It is administered by the Fundación Jocotoco and its infrastructure includes paths and interpretation stations for visitors.
The Patagrande Mirador is a center of Catholic Christian adoration. Processions take place here during Holy Week and on May 3 (Finding of the Holy Cross). 
Other attractions include the tourist complex at Tarapal and crafts at Piedra Blanca and Palo Solo, La Cabaña del Café ubicada en Mirmir sector Lozumbe Parroquia San Roque.

Cuisine
Typical dishes of the area include "repe" (a creamy green banana soup) and "biscochuelo", among others

References

External links
 VisitaElOro.com Tourism, Travel, History, Picture Gallery of Piñas "Orquidea de los Andes" in El Oro, Ecuador and "Parte Alta"
 :: El Porta de los Piñasienses :: - Portal convivial, informativo e interactivo de su gente
 The Best of Ecuador: Piñas
 Rincon de la parte alta
 radio impacto
 radio lluvia
 www.ciudadorquidea.com Portal Turistico,informativo y comercial de Piñas
 Radio elite Piñas
 [https://www.flickr.com/photos/jaimeserrano/

Cantons of El Oro Province